The name Mael resembles old Celtic names from Brittany, Wales, and Ireland.

"Mael" is a Breton boys' name meaning "chief" or "prince". The name for girls is "Maela".

The Breton name is popular in French as "Maël", with French girl-forms "Maëlys" and "Maëlle", largely after the Breton Saint Maël.

The Welsh boys name Mael was borne by the legendary son of Roycol.

The old Irish word "máel" (now spelt "maol"), meaning "bald" and hence "monk", was sometimes put before Gaelic names to form new names such as "Maolcholuim" (spelt "Malcolm" by the English), which means "monk/follower of Columba".

Notes

Breton masculine given names
Welsh masculine given names
Irish-language masculine given names